The Wildwood Plantation is a Southern plantation with a historic Greek Revival mansion located along LA 68, about  south of Jackson, Louisiana.

The plantation house was listed on the National Register of Historic Places on June 30, 1988.

See also
National Register of Historic Places listings in East Feliciana Parish, Louisiana

References

Plantations in Louisiana
Greek Revival houses in Louisiana
Houses in East Feliciana Parish, Louisiana
Houses on the National Register of Historic Places in Louisiana
National Register of Historic Places in East Feliciana Parish, Louisiana